The Forgotten Soldier (1965), originally published in French as Le soldat oublié, is an account by Guy Sajer (pseudonym of Guy Mouminoux) of his experiences as a German soldier on the Eastern Front during World War II. With reference to the author's ambiguous relationship to war, the book has been called "the account of a disastrous love affair with war and with the army that, of all modern armies, most loved war", being written with the "admiration of a semi-outsider". The English edition was translated by Lily Emmet.

Personal narrative
Sajer wrote that The Forgotten Soldier was intended as a personal narrative, stressing the non-technical and anecdotal nature of his book. In a 1997 letter to US Army historian Douglas Nash, he stated that, "Apart from the emotions I brought out, I confess my numerous mistakes. That is why I would like that this book may not be used under [any] circumstances as a strategic or chronological reference."

After reading Sajer's latest letter, one of his staunchest critics—Großdeutschland Veteran's Association leader Helmuth Spaeter—recanted his original suspicions of Sajer, noting "I have underestimated Herr Sajer and my respect for him has greatly increased. I am myself more of a writer who deals with facts and specifics, much less like one who writes in a literary way. For this reason, I was very skeptical towards the content of his book."

The British writer Alan Clark, author of Barbarossa: The Russian-German Conflict 1941–45, refers to Sajer's book in his Diaries as a book "to which AC [Alan Clark] often turned". The book was considered by the U.S. Army Command and General Staff College to be an accurate roman à clef and has remained on its recommended reading list for World War II, along with other historical novels. It is also on the recommended reading list of the Commandant of the United States Marines Corps.

Reviews and critical commentary
The book was reviewed in The New York Times by J. Glenn Gray in 1971. He reports the "book is painful to get through. But it is also difficult to put down and is worth the cost in horror that reading it entails." Other reviews from 1971 include The New Yorker, Time magazine, and The New Republic by James Walt. Walt says the book is not anti-war but an accounting of those soldiers caught up in events bigger than themselves.

Other more recent English reviewers include James Varner in Military Review in 2009. Jason S. Ridler in "War in the Precious Graveyard: Death through the Eyes of Guy Sajer", from the journal War, Literature, and the Arts suggests that Sajer idealized death in battle, and Sajer's reactions to corpses in the book reveals survivor guilt.

Criticism
The accuracy and authenticity of the book have been disputed by some historians. Some of the details Sajer mentions appear to be incorrect, while other are impossible to verify due to the lack of surviving witnesses and documents.

The most frequently cited inaccuracy is Sajer's statement that, after being awarded the coveted Grossdeutschland Division cuff title, he and a friend were ordered to sew it on their left sleeves, when it was actually sewn on the right sleeve. Edwin Kennedy wrote that this error was "unimaginable" for a former member of such an elite German unit. Sajer also discusses campaign locations in vague terms and never with specific dates. For example, he asserts that during the summer of 1942 he was briefly assigned to a Luftwaffe training unit in Chemnitz commanded by famed Stuka ace Hans-Ulrich Rudel, but according to Rudel himself, his training unit was actually in Graz, Austria, during the whole of 1942. Sajer mentions seeing "the formidable Focke-Wulf [...] 195s, which could soar up quickly," taking off from an airfield outside Berlin, when no such aircraft ever existed (a Focke-Wulf projekt 195, a heavy transport, was in the pipeline, but never got off the drawing board). Finally, the names of most of Sajer's companions and leaders do not appear on official rolls in the Bundesarchiv, nor are they known to the Grossdeutschland Veterans Association, whose leader, Helmuth Spaeter, was one of the first to question whether Sajer actually served in the Grossdeutschland Division as he claimed.

However, some authors and other Großdeutschland veterans have testified to the book's historical plausibility, even if they cannot speak to the specific events in the book. Lieutenant Hans Joachim Schafmeister-Berckholtz, who served in the Grossdeutschland during the same period as Sajer, confirmed in a letter that he had read the book and considered it an accurate overall account of the Division's battles in the East, while also noting that he remembered a Landser named Sajer in his Panzergrenadier company (5th co), the same company number Sajer mentions being assigned to (though there was more than one "5th Company" in the Division).

Sajer himself struck back against implications of fraud or fiction by claiming that The Forgotten Soldier was intended as his own personal recollections of an intensely chaotic period in German military history, and not an attempt at a serious historical study of World War II: "You ask me questions of chronology, situations, dates, and unimportant details. Historians and archivists have harassed me for a long time with their rude questions. All of this is unimportant. Other authors and high-ranking officers could respond to your questions better than I. I never had the intention to write a historical reference book; rather, I wrote about my innermost emotional experiences as they relate to the events that happened to me in the context of the Second World War."

Film rights
Dutch film director Paul Verhoeven has discussed with Sajer the possibility of turning The Forgotten Soldier into a film.

Bibliography
 Le soldat oublié by Guy Sajer (1965),

References

External links
Discussion at custermen.net of the authenticity of The Forgotten Soldier Retrieved 2019
Bibliography and sources for The Forgotten Soldier, by Jonathan Kraetsch, UC Santa Barbara
The Forgotten Soldier, at Internet Archive

French autobiographical novels
World War II memoirs